Bever is a river of North Rhine-Westphalia, Germany.

After being dammed by the  into the Beverteich, it flows into the Wupper in Hückeswagen.

See also
List of rivers of North Rhine-Westphalia

References

Rivers of North Rhine-Westphalia
Rivers of Germany